USS Monssen may refer to:

 , was a  that served from 1940 until sunk during the Naval Battle of Guadalcanal in 1942
 , was a  that served from 1943 until 1957

United States Navy ship names